Hungerford Lock is a lock on the Kennet and Avon Canal, at Hungerford, Berkshire, England.

The lock has a rise/fall of 8 ft 0 in (2.44 m).

References

See also

 Locks on the Kennet and Avon Canal

Locks of Berkshire
Locks on the Kennet and Avon Canal
Hungerford